Frederick Ernst Ruffini (1851 – November 16, 1885) was a notable American architect.

Life and career
Ruffini's parents, Ernst Frederick Ruffini and Adelheit (Adelaide) Riehme, immigrated from Kamenz, Germany to Chicago in 1848 and then settled in Cleveland. Ruffini is sometimes identified as Italian, but his ancestors had emigrated to Kamenz, about five hundred years before he was born.

Ruffini apprenticed under an architect in Cleveland and worked in Indianapolis, New York City, Boston and Chicago before moving to Austin, Texas in 1877. He partnered with Jasper N. Preston for two years before working on his own. He worked some with his brother, architect Oscar Ruffini of San Angelo, Texas.

Ruffini designed courthouses and jails, commercial and public buildings, and residences which were built throughout Texas. Ruffini's extant designs in Texas include the Old Blanco County Courthouse in Blanco, the Collin County Jail in McKinney, and the Millett Opera House in Austin. Mnny of his works are listed on the National Register of Historic Places. His non-extant buildings in Texas include the Old Main Building of the University of Texas at Austin.

Ruffini married Elise (Lizzie) Weitz and they had three children. Ruffini died in Austin in November 1885, a month after his wife died.

References

External links

Texas Courthouses on Texas Escapes.com

Architects from Texas
1885 deaths
1851 births
19th-century American architects